Pristimantis attenboroughi, also known as Attenborough's rubber frog, is a species of frog in the family Strabomantidae. It is endemic to the Peruvian Andes and has been recorded in and near the Pui–Pui Protection Forest. It is the first amphibian named after David Attenborough. It was discovered by Edgar Lehr and Rudolf von May during a period of two years of studying the forests of Peru.

Description 

Adult males measure  and adult females  in snout–vent length. The snout is short and rounded. No tympanum is present. The finger and toe tips are narrow and rounded, without circumferential grooves; neither lateral fringes nor webbing is present. The dorsal coloration ranges from pale gray to reddish brown to brownish olive. There are scattered flecks and sometimes an X-shaped scapular mark. Most specimens have dark grayish-brown canthal and supratympanic stripes. Juveniles are paler in coloration, yellowish to reddish brown, bearing contrasting dark brown flecks and distinct canthal and supratympanic stripes.

Reproduction occurs by direct development, that is, there is no free-living tadpole stage.

Habitat and conservation
A female was found guarding a clutch of 20 eggs inside moss.

Although this species could qualify as "endangered" or "vulnerable" because of its small range, the International Union for Conservation of Nature (IUCN) assessed it in 2018 as "near threatened". The category was chosen because the overall population is believed to be stable, the species is common, and much of the known range is within a protected area.

References

attenboroughi
Frogs of South America
Amphibians of the Andes
Amphibians of Peru
Endemic fauna of Peru
Endangered species
Amphibians described in 2017
David Attenborough